East Parsonsfield is an unincorporated village in the town of Parsonsfield, York County, Maine, United States. The community is located along Maine State Route 160 near the town's eastern border with Cornish. East Parsonsfield has a post office with ZIP code 04028.

References

Villages in York County, Maine
Parsonsfield, Maine